Cnephasia microbathra, also known as the brownshouldered leaf-tyer, is a species of moth of the family Tortricidae. It was first described by Edward Meyrick in 1911.  This species is endemic to New Zealand.

Taxonomy 
This species was first described by Edward Meyrick in 1911 and named Cnephasia microbathra. However the placement of this species within the genus Cnephasia is in doubt.  As a result, this species may be referred to as Cnephasia (s.l.) microbathra.

Distribution 
This species is endemic to New Zealand can be found only in the South Island.

Behaviour 
The larvae of this species fold and tie with silk the frond tips of its species to create a shelter. The larvae feed from this shelter and flick their waste out. The adult moth is on the wing from September to February.

References

microbathra
Moths described in 1911
Moths of New Zealand
Endemic fauna of New Zealand
Taxa named by Edward Meyrick
Endemic moths of New Zealand